Gunmen of Abilene is a 1950 American Western film directed by Fred C. Brannon and written by M. Coates Webster. The film stars Allan Lane, Eddy Waller, Roy Barcroft, Donna Hamilton, Peter Brocco and Selmer Jackson. The film was released as a Fawcett Movie Comic#3 on February 6, 1950, by Republic Pictures.

Plot

Cast
Allan Lane as Rocky Lane
Black Jack as Rocky Lane's Stallion
Eddy Waller as Sheriff Nugget Clark
Roy Barcroft as Brink Fallon
Donna Hamilton as Mary Clark
Peter Brocco as Henry Turner
Selmer Jackson as Dr. Johnson
Duncan Richardson as Dickie Harper
Arthur Walsh as Tim Johnson
Don C. Harvey as Henchman Todd
Don Dillaway as Bill Harper
George Chesebro as Martin
Steve Clark as Wells

References

External links 
 

1950 films
American Western (genre) films
1950 Western (genre) films
Republic Pictures films
Films directed by Fred C. Brannon
Films adapted into comics
American black-and-white films
1950s English-language films
1950s American films